"Can't Stop the Music" is a song recorded by American disco group the Village People. As the group's first release after the exit of original lead singer Victor Willis, with lead vocals sung by replacement cop Ray Simpson, the song was the first Village People single since their commercial breakthrough to not chart inside the US top 40, though it fared much better in Europe (reaching #7 in Belgium, #10 in West Germany, #11 in the UK, #15 in Sweden, #18 in Ireland, and #19 in Austria), South Africa (reaching #1 in the country), and Oceania (reaching #1 in Australia and #2 in New Zealand). It is the title track from the soundtrack album of their feature movie, Can't Stop the Music, which failed to attract a major audience, except in Australia.

Recently, Village People have included "Can’t Stop The Music" in their set, breaking tradition of the Cop singing lead and instead having two of the other members take over lead vocal duties as Victor takes a break in the middle of the show.

Critical reception
Cash Box said that compared to the Village People's previous hits, this song "[emphasizes] the music a bit more and [softens] the normally strident beat." Record World said that "this joyous dancer reaches epic proportions via strings & a full chorus."

Personnel
 Ray Simpson - vocals
 Felipe Rose - backing vocals
 Alex Briley - backing vocals
 Glenn Hughes - backing vocals
 David Hodo  - backing vocals
 Randy Jones - backing vocals

Charts

Weekly charts

Year-end charts

Covers
Puerto Rican boy band Menudo wrote a Spanish-language adaptation of the song, entitled "No Se Puede Parar la Música", in 1981.

References

1980 singles
Village People songs
Number-one singles in Australia
Number-one singles in South Africa
Songs written by Jacques Morali
Casablanca Records singles
Song recordings produced by Jacques Morali
Disco songs
1980 songs
Songs about music